The Golden Vein (Italian: La vena d'oro) is a 1928 Italian silent comedy film directed by Guglielmo Zorzi and starring Diana Karenne, Elio Steiner, and Giovanni Cimara. It was adapted from Zorzi's own play. It is now considered a lost film. It was subsequently remade as sound film in 1955.

Cast
 Diana Karenne as Contessa Maria Usberti
 Elio Steiner as Corrado Usberti, suo figlio
 Giovanni Cimara as Guido Manfredi
 Enrico Scatizzi as il professore Alban
 Nini Dinelli as Amelia Carena
 Augusto Bandini 
 Carlo Benetti
 Renato Malavasi

References

Bibliography
 Enrico Lancia & Roberto Poppi. Dizionario del cinema italiano: Gli artisti. Gli attori dal 1930 ai giorni nostri. M - Z., Volume 3. Gremese Editore, 2003.

External links

 

1928 films
1928 comedy films
Italian comedy films
Italian silent feature films
1920s Italian-language films
Films directed by Guglielmo Zorzi
Silent comedy films
1920s Italian films